Oregon State University's College of Engineering is the engineering college of Oregon State University, a public research university in Corvallis, Oregon. U.S. News & World Report ranks OSU's engineering college 73rd in the nation for 2022. The ranking makes the college one of the top two in the Northwest, while the college's nuclear engineering school ranks 12th nationally.

In 2022 student enrollment at the college reached over 9,800, with just over 8,500 of those undergraduates. The college is now the largest on campus and the tenth largest engineering college in the nation (2022).

History 
Oregon State University is the only public university in the state to offer fully accredited degrees in all of the major engineering fields. OSU was designated Oregon's engineering university by the State Board of Higher Education in 1914, with the goal of providing the university a distinct curriculum among Oregon universities. The College of Engineering claims over 35,000 graduates since its founding in 1889.

Schools 
 Mechanical, Industrial, and Manufacturing Engineering
 Civil and Construction Engineering 
 Electrical Engineering and Computer Science
 Chemical, Biological, and Environmental Engineering
 Nuclear Science and Engineering

Campus
OSU engineering continues to expand its campus footprint to accommodate higher enrollments and the addition of new programs. A new 153,000-square-foot building was added to the campus in 2006. The Kelley Engineering Center is home to the school of electrical engineering and computer science. A major remodel was also completed to Kearney Hall in 2008. The recent renovation now serves home to the school of civil and construction management engineering.

Size 
As of Fall 2022, there were over 9,800 students enrolled in the College of Engineering at the Corvallis campus. The College of Engineering's faculty is made up of approximately 122 members whose time is split between teaching and research. The college's operational budget for the 2022–2023 school year was $128.2 million with $64.6 million from research grants and $19.4 million from private donors.

Computer science (CS) students set a new record in 2022. CS students were awarded more CS degrees than any other engineering college in the nation.

Expansion
College of Engineering Alum and nVIDIA founder and CEO Jen-Hsun “Jensen” Huang is helping to build a $200 million research and education center planned for campus. The center will be named after the alum and his wife, Lori Huang, who are donating $50 million to the project. The Jen-Hsun and Lori Huang Collaborative Innovation Complex (CIC) will feature a massive AI supercomputer – powered, of course, by nVIDIA hardware.

The campus recently celebrated the opening of Johnson Hall. The Hall is the new home for the School of Chemical, Biological, and Environmental Engineering. Peter Johnson and his wife, Rosalie, both alumni of the school, sponsored the new addition with a $7 million dollar gift for its construction in 2016. The 58,000 squire-foot building, features an entryway plaza, modern offices, laboratory classrooms and open spaces for the school's faculty and students. Johnson invented a device and process used to manufacture longer-lasting lead-acid car batteries in 1980. He went on to found Tekmax Inc. in 1981.

Notable alumni

Thomas J. Autzen, electrical engineer, co-inventor of plywood manufacturing glue-spreader 
Richard D. Braatz, acclaimed researcher in control theory and its applications, current Edwin R. Gilliland professor in chemical engineering at the Massachusetts Institute of Technology.
George Bruns, an American composer of music for film and television, four Academy Award nominations, and three Grammy Award nominations.
Randy Conrads, Classmates.com founder
Marion Eugene Carl, American military officer, World War II fighter ace, record-setting test pilot, and naval aviator
Holly Cornell, co-founder of international environmental engineering company CH2M
Douglas Engelbart, inventor of the computer mouse
Paul Hugh Emmett, Chemical engineer who pioneered in catalysis, co-namesake of BET theory and member of the Manhattan Project
Dick Fosbury, best known for inventing the Fosbury flop, gold medalist in 1968 Olympics, co-owner of Galena Engineering, Inc. in Ketchum, Idaho.
Peter Gassner, co-founder of Veeva Systems
Milton Harris, founder of Harris Research Laboratories (known as Gillette today)
Thomas Burke Hayes, co-founder of international environmental engineering company CH2M
James Howland, co-founder of international environmental engineering company CH2M
Jen-Hsun Huang, founder of nVIDIA Corp
Glenn Jackson, former Oregon Transportation Commission chair, namesake Glenn L. Jackson Memorial Bridge 
Timothy S. Leatherman of Leatherman Tool Group, Inc.
Conde McCullough, known for designing many of Oregon's coastal bridges on U.S. Route 101
William Oefelein, NASA Astronaut
Glenn Odekirk, Hughes Aircraft Aerospace Engineer, helped design the H-4 Hercules, portrayed in the 2004 movie The Aviator as "Odie"
Hüsnü Özyeğin, founder of Finansbank in 1987, one of Turkey's most successful bankers. 
Linus Pauling, 1954 Nobel Prize in Chemistry & 1962 Nobel Peace Prize recipient; the only person ever to win two unshared Nobel Prizes
Donald Pettit, NASA astronaut
Stephen O. Rice, pioneer in the related fields of information theory, communications theory, and telecommunications
Ada-Rhodes Short, mechatronic design engineer and transgender rights activist
Bert Sperling, acclaimed author and researcher of cities, owner of BestPlaces.net
Frederick Steiwer, Oregon state senator. district attorney and 1936 Republican presidential candidate
William Tebeau, first African-American male graduate, chemical engineering, 1948, namesake of William Tebeau Residence Hall
Lee Arden Thomas, acclaimed early Oregon architect, known for designing landmark downtown buildings 
Earl A. Thompson, American engineer and inventor, credited with the invention of the  synchromesh manual transmission in 1918. 
James K. Weatherford, Oregon attorney, judge, and state politician 
John A. Young, former CEO of Hewlett-Packard

Notable faculty
 Octave Levenspiel, emeritus professor of chemical engineering at Oregon State University, author of five books, and member of the National Academy of Engineering

References

External links 
 

1889 establishments in Oregon
Educational institutions established in 1889
Engineering schools and colleges in the United States
Engineering universities and colleges in Oregon
Oregon State University